Eucereon ladas is a moth of the subfamily Arctiinae. It was described by Schaus in 1892. It is found in Rio de Janeiro, Brazil.

References

ladas
Moths described in 1892